"Everything Has Changed" is a song written and recorded by American singer-songwriter Taylor Swift featuring English singer-songwriter Ed Sheeran, taken from Swift's fourth studio album, Red (2012). Produced by Butch Walker, the track was released as the sixth single from the album on July 14, 2013. A music video for the song was released prior, on June 6, 2013. "Everything Has Changed" is a guitar-led folk-pop ballad. The lyrics are about wanting to know a new lover better. The single received mixed reviews from music critics, who either complimented or criticized the production.

"Everything Has Changed" peaked at number 32 on the US Billboard Hot 100 and was certified double platinum by the Recording Industry Association of America (RIAA). It reached the top 10 on charts of Ireland, Scotland, and the United Kingdom, and was certified platinum in the lattermost country. Swift performed "Everything Has Changed" with Sheeran on Britain's Got Talent on June 8, 2013, and included it in the set list of the Red Tour (2013–2014). A re-recorded version, "Everything Has Changed (Taylor's Version)", was included on Swift's re-recorded album Red (Taylor's Version), released on November 12, 2021.

Background and composition 
Swift released her third studio album, Speak Now, in October 2010. She wrote the album by herself and co-produced it with Nathan Chapman. Speak Now was similar to Swift's previous album, Fearless (2008), in its country pop production style. On her fourth studio album, Red (2012), Swift wanted to experiment with other musical styles. To this end, she approached different producers other than Chapman, beyond her career base in Nashville, Tennessee.

Swift wrote "Everything Has Changed" with Sheeran on a trampoline in Swift's backyard. It was produced by Butch Walker, a prominent contemporary hip hop producer. Swift initially worked with Walker and Sheeran on separate songs, but brought "Everything Has Changed" to Walker because she "knew he would approach it from an organic place, which is where [Sheeran] comes from". She chose Walker as a new collaborator on Red because she admired his "emotionally charged" production.

"Everything Has Changed" is a midtempo ballad driven by guitar. Critics described it as a folk-pop song. The track extensively uses syncopation at the sixteenth-note level, which musicologist James E. Perone deemed a trademark style of Swift's music and reminiscent of her self-titled debut album (2006). Perone commented that "Everything Has Changed" incorporates hip-hop influences with the deep bass drum beats in its production. Lyrically, the song is about two new lovers wanting to get to know each other better. Both Swift and Sheeran provide lead vocals, alternating between the verses.

Critical reception 

"Everything Has Changed" received mixed reviews from music critics. Perone gave the song a positive review, calling it a pleasant track that "should not be overlooked". Mesfin Fekadu of the Associated Press considered "Everything Has Changed" a highlight on Red, praising Swift and Sheeran's falsetto vocals. In the Los Angeles Times, Randall Roberts called it a "powerful collaboration" and picked it as one of the album's "well-constructed pop songs Taylor-made for bedroom duets". Phil Gallo from Billboard considered the song "Swift at her most plaintive". Another Billboard article reviewing Red gave the song a mixed review, criticizing the lyrics as clichéd but complimenting Sheeran's harmony vocals.

Jon Caramanica from The New York Times considered Swift's songwriting on "Everything Has Changed" not as strong as on her past songs, but still maintained "her ear for the awkward and tentative rhythms of romantic bonding". Robert Cospey of Digital Spy gave the song a three stars out of five rating, praising the song's musical style as "cutesy" but felt that "their exchanges leave us with a warm and fuzzy feeling that is all too rare these days". Sian Rowe, a writer from NME was upright critical, deeming it inferior to respective singer-songwriters' material and "disappointing in every way". Bernard Perusse from the Edmonton Journal considered it a weak song. Tony Clayton-Lea from The Irish Times deemed the track Swift's "desperate attempt" to reach out to new audiences. Also from The Irish Times, Eoin Butler gave the single a two-out-of-five rating, calling it a "typically slushy ballad".

Release and commercial performance
"Everything Has Changed" is track number 14 on Red, which was released on October 22, 2012, by Big Machine Records. In April 2013, Swift announced that "Everything Has Changed" would be released as a single in the United Kingdom. It was released in the United Kingdom on July 14, 2013, and in the United States two days later.

In the United States, "Everything Has Changed" peaked at number 32 on the US Billboard Hot 100 chart. On Billboard airplay charts, it peaked at number eight on the Adult Pop Songs, number 11 on the Adult Contemporary, and number 14 on the Mainstream Top 40 charts. It had sold 1.1 million copies in the United States by November 2017. The Recording Industry Association of America (RIAA) certified the single double platinum for surpassing two million units based on sales and streaming. On the Canadian Hot 100, the single peaked at number 28. "Everything Has Changed" was a top-ten chart hit in other English-speaking countries, peaking at number five in Ireland, number seven in Scotland and the United Kingdom. It was certified gold in New Zealand, and platinum in Australia and the United Kingdom.

Accolades

Music video 
A music video for "Everything Has Changed" was released on Swift's Vevo channel on YouTube on June 6, 2013. It was directed by Philip Andelman and filmed in Oak Park, California at Medea Creek Middle School and San Antonio, Texas. The video begins with two children who initially appear to be Swift and Sheeran when they were much younger, meeting each other on a bus to elementary school. Throughout the video, the two children engage in many activities at school together, including painting their faces with crayons, pretending to be a princess and knight, and dancing with each other in the empty school gym. At the end, Swift and Sheeran appear and are revealed to actually be the parents of their child counterparts, arriving at the school to pick them up and take them back to their respective homes.

Jason Lipshutz from Billboard labelled the video as "impossibly adorable", while Ray Rahman from Entertainment Weekly compared the video's synopsis to Forrest Gump, but "much more gentle than that". The two actors who starred in the "Everything Has Changed" video appeared together again in the music video of "The Joker and the Queen" (2022), a song by Sheeran featuring Swift. To this extent, some media publications deemed "The Joker and the Queen" a sequel to the "Everything Has Changed" video.

Live performances 
On June 8, 2013, Swift and Sheeran performed "Everything Has Changed" together on season finale of the seventh series of Britain's Got Talent. Swift also sang the song on her Red Tour (2013).

Personnel
Adapted from Red album liner notes

 Taylor Swift – lead vocals, songwriter
 Ed Sheeran – featured vocals, songwriter
 Butch Walker – producer, guitars, keyboards, percussion, drums, backing vocals
 Jake Sinclair – recording, bass guitar, backing vocals
 Justin Niebank – mixing
 Drew Bollman – assistant mixing
 Hank Williams – mastering
 Joann Tominaga – production coordinator
 Patrick Warren – string arrangement, composition
 Gary Lightbody – background vocals

Charts

Weekly charts

Year-end charts

Certifications

Release history

"Everything Has Changed (Taylor's Version)"

Swift re-recorded "Everything Has Changed", subtitled "(Taylor's Version)", with Sheeran for her second re-recorded album, Red (Taylor's Version), released on November 12, 2021, through Republic Records. Prior to the release, on August 23, 2021, Sheeran shared a clip on social media showing him in the studio, re-recording the track and another collaboration with Swift for Red (Taylor's Version) titled "Run". "Everything Has Changed (Taylor's Version)" charted on the singles charts of Canada and the United States, and peaked at number 59 on the Billboard Global 200 chart.

Personnel
Adapted from Red (Taylor's Version) liner notes
 Taylor Swift – lead vocals, background vocals, songwriter
 Ed Sheeran – lead vocals, background vocals, songwriter, acoustic guitar
 Butch Walker – producer, engineer, bass, drums, guitar, keyboard, percussion, background vocals
 Christopher Rowe – vocals engineer
 Robert Sellens – vocals engineer
 Bryce Bordone – engineer
 Serban Ghenea – mixer
 Gary Lightbody – background vocals

Charts

References

Source

2010s ballads
2012 songs
2013 singles
American folk songs
Taylor Swift songs
Ed Sheeran songs
Male–female vocal duets
Songs written by Taylor Swift
Songs written by Ed Sheeran
Song recordings produced by Butch Walker
Big Machine Records singles
Republic Records singles
Pop ballads
Folk ballads
Music videos directed by Philip Andelman